Imeni Frunze (lit. named after Frunze) is the name of several rural localities in Russia:
imeni Frunze, Altai Krai, a settlement in Ust-Kazhinsky Selsoviet of Krasnogorsky District in Altai Krai; 
imeni Frunze, Vladimir Oblast, a settlement in Kameshkovsky District of Vladimir Oblast